Waitin' for the Night is the third studio album by American all-female rock band the Runaways. It was originally released on 7 October 1977, on the Mercury label. This is the first album to feature the band as a quartet, as rhythm guitarist Joan Jett took over lead vocals in the wake of the departure of Cherie Currie for a solo career and Vicki Blue replaced Jackie Fox on bass. Though it failed to chart in the US, it was successful in Europe. The album entered at No. 34 on the Swedish Albums Chart, and the lead single 'School Days' peaked at No. 29 in Belgium.

Track listing

Personnel
The Runaways
Joan Jett – lead and background vocals; rhythm guitar
Lita Ford – lead guitar; backing vocals
Vicki Blue – bass guitar; backing vocals
Sandy West – drums; backing vocals

Production
Kim Fowley – producer
Taavi Mote – engineer
Sherry Klein – assistant engineer

Charts
Album

Singles

References

External links

The Runaways albums
1977 albums
Mercury Records albums
Albums produced by Kim Fowley